Christian Maldini (born 14 June 1996) is an Italian footballer who plays as a defender for Italian  club Lecco. A left-footed defender, Maldini is capable of playing as a centre-back and as a left-back.

Career

Early career
Maldini started his career at A.C. Milan Primavera but never broke through to the first team. In 2014, he spent half-season on loan at Brescia, but failed to make an appearance for the side. In honour of his late grandfather, Cesare, Maldini was named as the Milan Primavera captain for an Under-19 friendly match against Novara in April 2016.

In July 2016, Maldini left Milan for Reggiana, and subsequently loaned out to Hamrun Spartans. On 18 September 2016, he made his professional debut in the Maltese Premier League, playing as a starter in a 3–1 victory against St. Andrews.

Later career
On 23 January 2017, Maldini's loan at Hamrun Spartans was terminated and he was released by Reggiana to join Pro Sesto in Serie D.

He spent the 2017–18 season with Serie C club Fondi. On 6 July 2018, he was unveiled as a new player of Serie C club Pro Piacenza.

Pro Piacenza experienced financial troubles in the winter of 2019, and on 5 February 2019 he signed with Fano until the end of the 2018–19 season. In November 2019, he returned to Pro Sesto.

After two seasons at Pro Sesto, in August 2022 Maldini joined fellow Serie C club Lecco.

Personal life
Christian is the son of former Milan and Italy player Paolo Maldini, and the grandson of Cesare Maldini. His younger brother, Daniel, is a footballer who currently plays for Spezia Calcio. He is of Venezuelan descent through his mother.

References

External links
 
 

1996 births
Living people
Footballers from Milan
Italian people of Slovene descent
Italian people of Venezuelan descent
Italian footballers
Association football defenders
Serie C players
Serie D players
A.C. Milan players
Brescia Calcio players
A.C. Reggiana 1919 players
S.S.D. Pro Sesto players
S.S. Racing Club Fondi players
A.S. Pro Piacenza 1919 players
Alma Juventus Fano 1906 players
Calcio Lecco 1912 players
Maltese Premier League players
Ħamrun Spartans F.C. players
Italian expatriate footballers
Expatriate footballers in Malta
Italian expatriate sportspeople in Malta
Christian